Diego Losada (born 19 February 1972) is an Uruguayan former basketball player.

References

1972 births
Living people
Basketball players at the 1995 Pan American Games
Basketball players at the 1999 Pan American Games
Pan American Games competitors for Uruguay
Uruguayan men's basketball players